Abia is a genus of sawflies belonging to the family Cimbicidae. This genus includes several stout sawflies commonly encountered in Europe. Several species in the genus were formerly classified under the genus Zaraea, but this name is now treated as a synonym, as it is not monophyletic.

Species
Abia aenea
Abia antennata
Abia aurulenta
Abia candens
Abia fasciata
Abia fulgens
Abia hungarica
Abia lonicerae
Abia mutica
Abia nitens
Abia sericea
Abia spissicornis

References
*Fauna Europaea
Biolib

Tenthredinoidea